Barbra Streisand's Greatest Hits Volume 2 is the second greatest hits album recorded by American vocalist Barbra Streisand. It was released on November 15, 1978 by Columbia Records. The album is a compilation consisting of ten commercially successful singles from the singer's releases in the 1970s, with a majority of them being cover songs. It also features a new version of "You Don't Bring Me Flowers", which was released as the collection's only single on October 7, 1978. Originating on Streisand's previous album, Songbird, the new rendition is a duet with Neil Diamond who had also recorded the song for his 1978 album of the same name. The idea for the duet originated from DJ Gary Guthrie who sold the idea to the record label for $5 million.

Critically appreciated, Barbra Streisand's Greatest Hits Volume 2 received a perfect five star rating from both AllMusic and Rolling Stone. It was also a commercial success, topping the charts in Canada, New Zealand, the United Kingdom and the United States, and peaking at number two in Australia. The album later received certifications in a total of six countries, including in Australia, Canada and the United States. In the latter country, it was certified 5× Platinum and sold over 5 million copies according to the Recording Industry Association of America.

Promotion and development 
In May 1978, Streisand released her twentieth studio album Songbird that featured the song "You Don't Bring Me Flowers". Despite not being released as a physical or commercial single from Songbird, it was distributed in a 7" record format on October 7, 1978. However, the version that appears on Barbra Streisand's Greatest Hits Volume 2 is a duet with American singer Neil Diamond, who also contributed to the song's lyrics. As Streisand released Songbird, Diamond had already recorded a version of "You Don't Bring Me Flowers" on his "I'm Glad You're Here with Me Tonight" album. Because both versions of the song were recorded in the same key, American DJ Gary Guthrie combined the two songs together while playing records at a local radio station in Louisville, Kentucky. Guthrie pitched the idea to CBS Records International (the international arm of Columbia) for a $5 million contract, to which they eventually accepted, despite CBS breaching the contract initially. Their collaboration was a global, commercial success, topping the charts in both the United States and Canada. The version with Diamond has since sold more than 2 million copies in the United States.

A sequel to her first greatest hits album, Barbra Streisand's Greatest Hits (1970), the second volume contains ten singles released during Streisand's second decade in the recording industry, ranging from "Stoney End" (1970) to "You Don't Bring Me Flowers" (1978). The songs featured on the record were recorded between July 1970 and October 1978. Overall, it features a total of three number-one hits ("The Way We Were", "Evergreen", and "You Don't Bring Me Flowers"), two top-ten singles ("Stoney End" and "My Heart Belongs to Me"), and three Top 40 songs ("Sweet Inspiration / Where You Lead", "Songbird", and "Prisoner"). "All in Love Is Fair" and "Superman" are the two other songs on the track listing. Columbia Records released the compilation on November 15, 1978. The label also issued an 8-track cartridge version of the album in 1978, with a differing track listing; single "You Don't Bring Me Flowers" was split into two separate parts increasing the number of tracks on the record from ten to eleven. In 1987, the album was released in a compact disc format.

Critical reception 

Barbra Streisand's Greatest Hits Volume 2 was critically acclaimed by music critics. It was given a perfect five out of five stars rating by AllMusic's William Ruhlmann, who called it a "genre-defining album [...] that drew upon the rock revolution to redefine classic pop for a new generation". He also gave praise towards the album for successfully capturing the best of her "contemporary soft-rock [and] highly successful" singles from her "largely inconsistent" albums. Additionally, Ruhlmann claimed that the success of the record stemmed from the fact that her singles in the 1970s were more "precious" and not always "show music material", contrasting to her songs in the 1960s. As part of Rolling Stones The New Rolling Stone Record Guide, released in 1983, they rated the collection a perfect five stars. Streisand's first volume from 1970 and Guilty from 1980 also achieved the same status.

Commercial performance 
The compilation album was a success, topping the charts in four countries. In the United States, Barbra Streisand's Greatest Hits Volume 2 debuted at number seven on the Billboard 200 chart for the week ending December 2, 1978 (also serving as the week's highest new entry). The following week it rose to number three and on January 6, 1979, it topped the chart. The record spent a total of 46 weeks on the Billboard 200, and by December 1984, the album and Streisand's Guilty (1980) had both sold over 4 million physical copies in the United States, becoming quadruple certified by the RIAA. It would later be re-certified to 5× Platinum on October 28, 1994. It was the one of the United States' best-selling albums in 1979, coming in at number 28 on Billboards annual year-end chart. Billboards Fred Bronson wrote in The Billboard Book of Number One Hits that the commercial and critical achievements of "You Don't Bring Me Flowers" is what made Barbra Streisand's Greatest Hits Volume 2 a certified Platinum album in the US.

On Canada's chart, compiled by RPM, it debuted at number 60 on the week ending December 9, 1978. Four weeks later, it would top the chart on January 13, 1979. Overall, it spent a total of 20 weeks charting in Canada and later received a triple platinum certification from Music Canada on March 1, 1979. It was also Streisand's first chart-topping album in the United Kingdom, where it spent four consecutive weeks at the highest ranking position and later was certified Platinum for sales upwards of 300,000 copies.

In New Zealand, the album debuted at number five on January 28, 1979, becoming the chart's highest new entry. The following week, it topped the chart and remained at that position for four consecutive weeks; overall, it spent a total of 19 weeks charting in that country. It also charted in Australia, where it peaked at number two according to the Kent Music Report. The Australian Recording Industry Association certified Barbra Streisand's Greatest Hits Volume 2 double Platinum in 2000, signifying sales upwards of 140,000. Although the compilation did not chart in Hong Kong, the International Federation of the Phonographic Industry certified the album Platinum for sales of 20,000 copies in 1982.

Track listing

Personnel 
Credits adapted from the liner notes of the CD edition of Barbra Streisand's Greatest Hits Volume 2.

 Barbra Streisand vocals, production , songwriter 
 Alan Bergman songwriter 
 Marilyn Bergman songwriter 
 Charlie Calello production, arrangements 
 Larry Carlton rhythm arrangements 
 Nick de Caro arrangements , orchestra arrangements , string and horn arrangements 
 John Desautels songwriter 
 Neil Diamond composition , songwriter , duet vocal 
 Bob Gaudio production 
 Alan Gordon songwriter 
 Marvin Hamlisch composition , songwriter 
 Don Hannah arrangements 
 Carole King composition , songwriter 
 Gary Klein production 
 Charles Koppelman executive production 
 Karen Lawrence songwriter 

 Alan Lindgren arrangements 
 Tommy LiPuma production 
 Stephen Nelson songwriter 
 Laura Nyro songwriter 
 Spooner Oldham songwriter 
 Gene Page arrangements 
 Marty Paich production, arranging 
 Dan Penn songwriter 
 Richard Perry production 
 Phil Ramone production 
 Richie Snyder songwriter 
 Toni Stern songwriter 
 Paul Williams songwriter 
 Dave Wolfert songwriter 
 Stevie Wonder songwriter

Charts

Weekly charts

Year-end charts

Certifications

See also 
 List of Billboard 200 number-one albums of 1979
 List of UK Albums Chart number ones of the 1970s

References

Footnotes

Sources

External links 
 

1978 greatest hits albums
Barbra Streisand compilation albums
Columbia Records compilation albums